Angels Live in My Town is the second album from Belvedere, released in 2000.

Track listing 

 "2nd Column" – 3:05
 "The People's Song" – 2:30
 "Difference" – 3:01
 "Malpractice" – 2:34
 "Airplane" – 1:53
 "669 – The Number of The Feast" – 1:35
 "Mediator" – 2:53
 "Weekend Warrior" – 1:06
 "Todd" – 1:59
 "Not My Problem" – 2:19
 "Male Pattern Impotence" – 1:48
 "Condiment King" – 0:32
 "Sik Salvation" – 5:57

Trivia 
Before the 2nd Column, there's this speech:

"Ok, Ok...
And I was willing to mind my own business, I was willing to respect your territory and treat you like a man, but you couldn't leave it alone, could you? You couldn't let a man sit here for 5 minutes and take a rest on your precious piece of shit hill?
Ok..."

The voice there is from Michael Douglas from the film Falling Down (1993). It takes place in around 20 minutes of the movie.

2000 albums
Belvedere (band) albums